Aldehyde dehydrogenase 8 family, member A1 also known as ALDH8A1 is an enzyme that in humans is encoded by the ALDH8A1 gene.

Function 

This protein belongs to the aldehyde dehydrogenase family of enzymes. It was originally thought to play a role in a pathway of 9-cis-retinoic acid biosynthesis in vivo. However, bioinformatics and experimental work has shown that it is more likely the aldehyde dehydrogenase of the kynurenine pathway, oxidizing 2-aminomuconate semialdehyde to 2-aminomuconic acid. Two transcript variants encoding distinct isoforms have been identified for this gene.

References

External links